Arthur Paul Pedrick (3 September 1918 – 15 August 1976) was a prolific British inventor who filed for 162 United Kingdom patents between 1962 and his death in 1976 or 1977. His inventions were notable for their humour and almost complete lack of practical applicability.

Personal life
Very little is known about Pedrick. He worked for many years as a patent examiner at the United Kingdom Patent Office but that it was only after his retirement that he began filing patent applications for his inventions. The Patent Office has stringent restrictions on improbable gadgets, but Pedrick's familiarity with the process enabled him to satisfy the requirements and get his applications granted.

During this period he was resident in Selsey, Sussex, England, according to his patents. Sometimes his residence would further be listed as "One-Man Photo-Electric Research Laboratories", or "One Man Think Tank Nuclear Fusion Research Laboratories", and so forth. These laboratories were staffed by himself and a ginger coloured cat, sometimes referred to as "Ginger" although it is not clear whether this was actually his name. Ginger was of great help to Pedrick in developing his inventions. Unfortunately, it is recounted in some of the patents how Ginger was unable to secure financing to put the inventions into practice.

His patent for laser induced fusion includes these autobiographical notes:

It is my personal experience based on a severe bout of Dive bombing by Stuka dive bombers in a light cruiser HMS "Dido", in 1941, evacuating mainly New Zealanders from Crete, who had been sent in by the late Sir Winston Churchill, but who, after the battle with the Nazi paratroops had made the island untenable, Admiral Cunningham, the Naval C in C in Alexandria, realised must be got out if possible, that the surface warships just cannot survive attacks by large numbers of aircraft, on their own, and it is only the chance of fate that I happened to be in After Engine Room of the ship, when a bomb came down on B turret and created a carnage of twisted steel and bodies forward, that I am writing this now, but the memory of the experience still gives me a "nightmare" at times.

I have suffered all my life even from a by product of the 1914–18 war even if I was born after it. It is a personal fact that my father was a Lieutenant (E) serving in the disastrous K class submarines, by which the Royal Navy tried to create a Submarine which could steam on the surface at 20 knots to keep up with the Fleet, and he died of a lung infection created by the appalling conditions in such submarines, even before I was born. If a women [sic] is in bad metal [sic] state when she is in pregnant, it is obvious that she can pass on her state of mind to the foetus. This has made me a nervous individual all my life, and there are many times in my life I wish I had never been born. There are endless arguments about the subject of abortion on the "rights of the foetus", and these could all be settled if, in some way, the future could be predicted for the foetus and it could decide whether it "wanted to be born".

Inventions

Chromatically selective cat flap
Many of Pedrick's inventions related to his cat, Ginger. His crowning achievement in this respect was a patent titled "Photon Push-Pull Radiation Detector For Use in Chromatically Selective Cat Flap Control And 1000 Megaton Earth-Orbital Peace-Keeping Bomb".

The idea was to detect the difference in fur colour between a ginger cat and a black cat. He came up with this idea because a black cat named "Blackie" from next door kept trying to steal his own cat's food. However, with Pedrick's new catflap design, if Blackie attempted to use the cat-flap he would not be allowed in. Ginger was impressed with the idea, and further suggested that the concept could be applied as a nuclear deterrent. Ginger's concern over the Cold War and the nuclear arsenals threatening the world was a regular motivator for Pedrick's inventions.

Extinguishing fires in high rise block buildings
Pedrick was also concerned with the safety of his fellow man, as described in an "Apparatus for extinguishing fires in high rise block buildings of uniform transverse cross-section or plan".

Here, Pedrick suggests that fire curtains could be secured at the roof level of a high-rise building. When released, they would envelope substantially the entire building. The curtains could be provided with apertures which when the curtain is released are located opposite rooms in the building, these rooms being designated as ones in which the occupants should congregate in the event of fire. The concern however was that such large curtains would have prevented escape from the building as well as increase the risk of suffocation.

Transfer of fresh water 
Pedrick's concern for his fellow man is again shown in a patent titled "Arrangements for the transfer of fresh water from one location on the earth's surface to another at a different latitude, for the purpose of irrigation, with pumping energy derived from the effect of the earth's rotation about the polar axis".

In this patent, Pedrick describes in extremely long detail, with pages of mathematical equations, how snow and ice could be passed along pipelines from the Antarctic to irrigate the dry Australian outback, creating a "granary of the East" that could feed the burgeoning population of the world. Since the flow of water from one region to the other through such pipelines would not be practicable, according to Pedrick, the suggestion is to instead compress the snow into hard balls that could be fired along these pipelines as projectiles.

Notable quotations
Pedrick would often discuss, within his patents, the problems in the world that led him to his inventions and would also recount conversations between himself and his ginger cat. Some of these tangents in his patents show Pedrick to be a thoughtful, if slightly eccentric man, who was deeply concerned with the well-being of others and for the future of mankind, as well as being dismissive of modern capitalism.

Characteristic observations on the world around him include the following:
"Almost 2000 years ago, a strange character called Jesus Christ went about Palestine saying we should all love our enemies, but he was crucified before much notice was taken of him, and it is curious that the very land of Palestine is now one of the World "Trouble spots" in 1974."
"It being the opinion of my Ginger Cat, that those cats that you see sponsoring various brands of tinned cat food on T/V are just as hypocritical as the various actors one sees sponsoring on T/V various commercial products, and in fact my Ginger Cat prefers ordinary Corned Beef to most brands of Cat food."
"Unfortunately it is fact that thermo-nuclear weapons can be contained with the noses of Interncontinental-ballistic-rockets which results in the fact that distrust between governments of nations able to manufacture nuclear weapons, for example the USA and USSR, results in such nations keeping in readiness large numbers of such rockets to be used as a so called "deterrent" against an attack by such other nations.
"Clearly if one such nation, for example the USA, could be assured by some system, which would be quite automatic, that any other nation making a nuclear attack upon it, would be sure to bring upon itself a similar nuclear devastation, it could then allow a run-down of its own thermo-nuclear weapons stocks for the deuterium and tritium to be used for peaceful purposes to overcome the "energy shortage""
"As Ginger pointed out to me the whole unfortunate situation might have been avoided if Albert Einstein had not "doodled out" his equation E = mc2, in the Swiss Patent Office around 1905 instead of getting on with the work he was being paid to do."

Response
"Funny" patents, such as those published by Pedrick, and their popularisation in the media upset many patent examiners who feel they tend to trivialise the subject.

Patents 
A selection from over 160 patents filed between 1962 and 1975.

References

External links
 The prolific Arthur Pedrick – IP Review
 The High-rise Fire Curtain – BBC article
 A patently absurd invention? – BBC story
 Crazy creations of infamous inventor – The Argus
 Arthur Paul Pedrick's Patents

Patent examiners
1918 births
1976 deaths
20th-century British inventors
People from Selsey
British humorists